Better Off Single (alternatively titled Stereotypically You) is a 2016 American romantic-comedy film written and directed by Benjamin Cox. The film stars Aaron Tveit, Abby Elliott, Lauren Miller Rogen, Kal Penn, Shane McRae, and Kelen Coleman.

The film was released on October 7, 2016 by Gravitas Ventures.

Cast 

 Aaron Tveit as Charlie
 Abby Elliott as Angela
 Lauren Miller Rogen as Kathy
 Kal Penn as Brice
 Shane McRae as Vince
 Kelen Coleman as Lorelei
 Jessica Rothe as Mary
 Haviland Morris as Angela's Mom

Release 
The film, originally titled Stereotypically You, was released by Gravitas Ventures on October 7, 2016.

Reception 
Gary Goldstein of The Los Angeles Times negatively reviewed the film and said "With its muddy timeline, kaleidoscope of fantasies, flashbacks and hallucinations, broad characterizations and sitcom slickness, the film never settles down long enough to congeal, much less feel remotely connected to reality." Morgan Rojas of Cinemacy also reviewed the film poorly, stating "Better Off Single seems to just fall a bit short of what it has set out to achieve."

References

External links 
 
 

2016 films
2016 romantic comedy films
American romantic comedy films
2010s English-language films
2010s American films
2016 directorial debut films